Cinema Vox was a 20th-century movie theater in Casablanca, Morocco. It was designed by Marius Boyer and completed in 1935, under the French Protectorate. It was considered one of the largest movie theaters in Africa.

Architecture 
It had three stacked balconies and could seat up to 2,000 spectators. It also had a foldaway ceiling, allowing the audience to enjoy the cool air of the evening. The building had the shape of a "cubic mass," which matched the Magasins Paris-Maroc Building next-door. The architecture of the Vox continued to serve as a reference for movie theaters built after independence.

Location 
It was located at Louis Gentil Square, now part of United Nations Square.

Miscellaneous 
Nass El Ghiwane had a breakthrough concert at Cinema Vox.

References 

Buildings and structures in Casablanca
20th century in Morocco
Cinemas and movie theaters
Architecture in Morocco
Cinema of Morocco